Anarawd ap Rhodri (died ) was a King of Gwynedd, referenced as "King of the Britons" in the Annales Cambriae (The Annals of Wales).

Anarawd's father Rhodri the Great, by conquest and alleged inheritances, had become ruler of most of northern Wales. However, under Welsh law he was bound to divide his lands among his able-bodied children upon his death during a Mercian invasion around 878. Anarawd, the eldest, retained the principal estate at Aberffraw and the throne of Gwynedd. His brothers Cadell and Merfyn also received large estates, sometimes said to include the kingdoms of Ceredigion and Powys, respectively. (Rhodri's fourth son, Tudwal the Lame, was apparently too young or not deemed able-bodied enough for the initial division.)

The brothers are recorded as cooperating closely against the rulers of the remaining lesser kingdoms of Wales. Æthelred of Mercia invaded Gwynedd around 881 and the Welsh annals hailed his defeat at Cymryd in the Battle of the Conwy as Dial Rhodri: "God's vengeance for Rhodri". Tudwal was old enough to participate in this battle, but his disfigurement on the field saw him judged as unfit to rule.

While Cadell then turned on his brother Merfyn, creating the realm that would later empower Hywel the Good, Anarawd made an alliance with the Danish king in York in an attempt to guard himself against further Mercian attacks. After that alliance proved unsatisfactory, he came to an agreement with Alfred the Great of Wessex, visiting Alfred at his court. He received honours and gifts from the Saxons, and King Alfred stood witness at his confirmation. According to Alfred's biographer Asser, Anarawd used his new Saxon allies to help in repelling a raid by his former Danish allies around 894 and to ravage Cadell's lands in Ceredigion and Ystrad Tywi the following year. Around 902, an attack on Anglesey by the Danes of Dublin under Ingimundr was repulsed. Anarawd died , succeeded by his eldest son Idwal the Bald.

See also
Kings of Wales family trees

References

Further reading

Monarchs of Gwynedd
House of Aberffraw
9th-century Welsh monarchs
10th-century Welsh monarchs
910s deaths
Year of birth unknown
Year of death uncertain